Kangerluk, also known as Kangerluluarak, is a fjord in the King Frederick VI Coast, Kujalleq municipality, southern Greenland.

History
In Kangerluk there is a small cove at a place named Saqqap Nuua (Serkertnua) where Lieutenant Wilhelm August Graah was detained seventeen days in 1829 during his East Coast expedition owing to the difficult ice and weather conditions to the north.

Mountains
Kangerluk is a short fjord. Several glaciers discharge into the fjord from the Graah Mountains (Graah Fjelde) rising to the west and displaying purple and blue strata.

To the southeast the fjord opens into the North Atlantic Ocean NW of Cape Discord and the island of Iluileq.

See also
List of fjords of Greenland
Syenite

References

External links
Shallow-water, eruption-fed, mafic pyroclastic deposits along a Paleoproterozoic coastline: Kangerluluk volcano-sedimentary sequence, southeast Greenland; Precambrian Research, Volume 101, Issues 2–4, June 2000, Pages 163–192

Fjords of Greenland